Platygobiopsis hadiatyae is a species of goby, commonly known as a Renny's flat goby.

Distribution
Currently only known from Panaitan Strait along the Sunda Strait in Indonesia.

Etymology
This species is named Renny Kurnia Hadiaty (21 August 1960 to 30 January 2019) of the Indonesian Institute of Sciences, Hadiaty co-authored 19 gobioid species names in addition to many other taxa.

Size

References

External links
 Platygobiopsis hadiatyae on FishBase

Gobiidae
Fish of Indonesia
Taxa named by Helen K. Larson
Taxa named by Heok Hui Tan
Fish described in 2020